Yelena Dudina is a Soviet sprint canoer who competed in the mid-1980s. She won a silver medal in the K-4 500 m event at the 1985 ICF Canoe Sprint World Championships in Mechelen.

References

Living people
Soviet female canoeists
Year of birth missing (living people)
Russian female canoeists
ICF Canoe Sprint World Championships medalists in kayak